Changes, also known as Danielle Steel's Changes, is a 1991 American made-for-television romantic drama film directed by Charles Jarrott. The film is based upon the 1983 novel of the same name written by Danielle Steel.

Plot
Melanie Adams is a divorced mother who gave birth to twin girls Val and Jessica at age 19 before becoming a successful news correspondent working in New York City. For her latest story, she travels to Los Angeles to do a report on a sick, but an optimistic girl. She immediately feels attracted to the girl's doctor, Peter Hallam. Peter is a widowed father of three children; 18-year-old Mark, 15-year-old Pam, and 8-year-old Matt. Their mother died of pulmonary hypertension after refusing treatment. The family is still grieving - especially Pam - has difficulty dealing with the loss.

After a short-lived romance, Melanie and Peter part ways. They soon conclude that they can't live without each other and Melanie reluctantly gives up her job, thereby ruining her chances of becoming an anchor, to move with Val and Jessica, now 16, to Los Angeles. There, she takes a job as a co-host at a local news program and soon finds out the other co-host, Paul Stevenson, is not glad about her arrival, trying to sabotage her opportunities. Further on, she and Peter are married.

Trying to adjust to Californian life does not go without trouble. Val and Mark fall in love and she becomes pregnant. Fearing their parents' judgment, they decide to visit a downtown inexperienced doctor for an abortion. Val soon becomes very sick, which forces Mark to tell Melanie and Peter the truth about her abortion. While dealing with this information, Melanie is bothered by the great impact Peter's first wife still has. Pam and the maid, Mrs. Hahn treat Melanie horribly by not allowing Melanie to take in her own furniture and the twins still have to use a spare room.

When Melanie finds out she is pregnant, Peter is delighted, but the children are disgusted. Realizing she already does not have enough time to spend time with Val and Jessica, she considers having an abortion. When Peter thinks she only wants an abortion because of her career, Melanie decides that she has had enough. She packs her stuff and runs away to San Francisco. The family soon realizes all the problems they have caused Melanie. Peter fires Mrs. Hahn for not accepting Melanie as his new wife, and he takes down his late wife's portrait from the wall. Afterward, Peter convinces Melanie to return and everyone - including Pam - apologizes.

The family decides to move to a new  house with more space, and Peter hires Raquel, her maid from New York. Melanie soon gives birth to twins.

Cast
Cheryl Ladd as Melanie Adams
Michael Nouri as Peter Hallam
Christopher Gartin as Mark Hallam
Christie Clark as Valerie 'Val' Adams
Renee O'Connor as Jessica Adams
Ami Foster as Pam Hallam
Joseph Gordon-Levitt as Matthew 'Matt' Hallam
Liz Sheridan as Mrs. Hahn
Betty Carvalho as Raquel
Randee Heller as Carol Kellerman
Cynthia Bain as Marie Dupres
Charles Frank as Brad Buckley
James Sloyan as Paul Stevenson
Luis Avalos as Ray
Flo Di Re as Helen

References

External links

1991 television films
1991 films
1991 romantic drama films
American romantic drama films
Films based on American novels
NBC Productions films
NBC network original films
Films directed by Charles Jarrott
Films scored by Lee Holdridge
Films based on romance novels
Films based on works by Danielle Steel
American drama television films
1990s American films